Xu Xing (born July 1969) is a Chinese paleontologist who has named more dinosaurs than any other living paleontologist. Such dinosaurs include the Jurassic ceratopsian Yinlong, the Jurassic tyrannosauroid Guanlong, the large oviraptorosaur Gigantoraptor, and the troodontid Mei.

Biography 
Xing was born in Xinjiang, China, in 1969. A graduate from the department of geology of Peking University, he is currently a researcher at the Institute of Vertebrate Paleontology and Paleoanthropology of the Chinese Academy of Sciences in Beijing. He had originally planned to become an economist. However, he was assigned to the department of geology by the Chinese authorities. He graduated in 1995, and claims inspiration from Roy Chapman Andrews.

Among Xu's paleontological contributions have been discovery and analysis of dinosaur fossils with avian characteristics, and development of theories in regarding the evolution of feathers.

Genera described by Xu Xing

Selected publications

See also
 :Category:Taxa named by Xu Xing

References

External links
Famous Expert Forum ( 2008-14): Research Fellow Xu Xing’s Academic Report

1969 births
Living people
Biologists from Xinjiang
Chinese paleontologists
Paleontology in Xinjiang
People from Ili
Peking University alumni
Members of the Chinese Academy of Sciences